Jonkheer John Hugo Loudon KBE (27 June 1905 – 4 February 1996) was the CEO of Royal Dutch Shell from 1952 to 1965 and the president of World Wide Fund for Nature.

Early life
Born in The Hague, Netherlands, the son of former Shell president Hugo Loudon, John Hugo Loudon got a law degree at Utrecht University. He joined the company in 1930, working in the oilfields of Lake Maracaibo, Venezuela.

Career

In 1952, Loudon became the head of Shell Petroleum. In this role he tried to prevent discrimination between nationals and non-nationals in the work force. In May 1960, he was featured on Time magazine's cover. He resigned as the CEO of Shell in 1965 and continued to serve the company as chairman of the board of supervisory directors for the next 11 years.

Following his role with Shell, Loudon was appointed the chairman of an international business advisory committee at Chase Bank by David Rockefeller. Loudon retired from this role in 1977.

Loudon became president of World Wide Fund for Nature in 1977 and served as president until 1981.

Personal life

In 1931 he married Marie van Tuyll van Serooskerken who became lady in waiting to Queen Wilhelmina and with whom he had four children. Later he married Charlotte Van Sminia.

Loudon spoke five languages and was a member of the Royal yacht Squadron.

References

1905 births
1996 deaths
Dutch chief executives in the oil industry
Shell plc people
Dutch nonprofit executives
Businesspeople from The Hague
Utrecht University alumni
Knights Commander of the Order of the British Empire
Chief Executive Officers of Shell plc